Leptosteges chrysozona is a moth in the family Crambidae. It was described by Harrison Gray Dyar Jr. in 1917. It has been recorded in the United States from Oklahoma and Texas.

References

Moths described in 1917
Schoenobiinae